The 2010 St. George Illawarra Dragons season was the 12th in the joint venture club's history. They competed in the National Rugby League's 2010 Telstra Premiership, securing their second successive minor premiership. The Dragons went on to compete in the 2010 NRL Grand Final, defeating the Sydney Roosters to gain the club's first premiership since their formation as a joint venture club in 1999.

Season summary
Restarting their ambitions of a maiden Premiership, the Dragons began the 2010 season without dual international Wendell Sailor after the winger announced his retirement during the pre-season. The Dragons had been competition favourites since day one of the 2010 season, and for all but three rounds of the entire regular season were on top of the ladder (the Sydney Roosters were on top after rounds 1 and 2 and the Melbourne Storm were on top after round 4, when they defeated the Dragons 17-4).

In the regular season of 2010, the Dragons lost only seven matches, against Melbourne in round 4, Manly in round 9, Canberra in rounds 11 and 24, Penrith in round 17, the Gold Coast in extra time in round 20 and Brisbane in round 21. The Dragons built their season on defence and when they finished the regular season, they became only the 2nd team in the NRL to concede less than 300 points in a season. 299 points were scored against them at an average of 12.4 points per game. The St George Illawarra Dragons headed into the week one of the finals and had a great victory against the Manly-Warringah Sea Eagles winning 28 - 0. After the week off the St George Illawarra Dragons faced the Wests Tigers in the preliminary final and won 13 - 12. The Dragons then faced the Sydney Roosters in the NRL Telstra Premiership Grand Final and despite trailing 6–8 at halftime they scored 26 unanswered points in a wet second half to win 32-8 and secure the first NRL Premiership for the joint venture.

A major coup for the club was the re-signing of former captain and star centre Mark Gasnier following his stint in French rugby union.

Pre-season

Regular season

Finals

2010 NRL Ladder

Squad

 (GK)

*VC - Vice Captain
*GK - Goal Kicker

Transfers
Gains

Losses

References

St. George Illawarra Dragons seasons
St. George Illawarra Dragons season